Trenitalia Tper (TTX) is a company operating train services in the Emilia-Romagna region, in Italy, on railway lines overseen by both Rete Ferroviaria Italiana and Ferrovie Emilia Romagna (FER).

The current company was born on 1 January 2020 from the merger of the railway transport division of TPER, which at that time operated railway transportation services on the network operated by FER, and the division of Trenitalia operating local railway transportation services in Emilia-Romagna, on the network operated by RFI.

Train services 
Trenitalia Tper operates the following train services:

On RFI lines:
SFM Bologna Route 1A Bologna-Porretta Terme
SFM Bologna Route 3 Bologna-Poggio Rusco
SFM Bologna Route 4A Bologna-Ferrara
SFM Bologna Route 4B Bologna-Imola
SFM Bologna Route 5 Bologna-Modena
Bologna-Parma/Piacenza/Voghera/Genoa
Parma-Milano
(Parma)/Fidenza-Salsomaggiore
(Bologna)/Modena-Carpi/Mantua/Verona
Bologna-Rimini/Ancona
Bologna-Ravenna/(Rimini)
Faenza-Granarolo-Ravenna/Lavezzola
Faenza-Borgo San Lorenzo/Florence
Bologna-San Benedetto Sambro/Prato/(Florence)
Bologna-Poggio Rusco/Verona/(Brennero)
Bologna-San Pietro in Casale/Ferrara/Rovigo/Venice
Rimini-Ravenna
Ravenna-Ferrara
Fidenza-Castelvetro-Cremona
Parma-Borgo Val di Taro/Pontremoli/La Spezia
Bologna-Marzabotto/Porretta Terme-Pistoia
Parma-Brescia

On FER lines:
SFM Bologna Route 2A Bologna Centrale-Vignola
SFM Bologna Route 2B Bologna Centrale-Portomaggiore
Modena-Sassuolo railway
Reggio Emilia-Sassuolo railway
Reggio Emilia-Guastalla railway
Reggio Emilia-Ciano d'Enza railway
Parma-Suzzara railway
Ferrara-Codigoro railway
Ferrara-Suzzara railway

The then Tper also used to operate the short-lived Portomaggiore-Dogato Railway, inaugurated in 2016 and closed less than one year later due to the low usage of trains, the lower frequencies of the trains (4 return journeys per day except on Sundays and Public Holiday), the 20 minutes of journey for just 13 km and one intermediate station and its lack of electrification, which caused lower speed and made impossible the usage of electric trains connecting to Bologna from Portomaggiore.

Traffic volume 

Daily data refer to the average working day and are updated to november 2019.

Notes and references 

Railway companies of Italy
Transport in Emilia-Romagna
Passenger rail transport in Italy
Companies based in Bologna
Transport companies established in 2020
Italian companies established in 2020